Aesopus clausiliformis is a species of sea snail, a marine gastropod mollusk in the family Columbellidae, the dove snails.

Description
The size of an adult shell varies between 10 mm and 15 mm.

The small, spindle-shaped shell has a chestnut color. It is covered with numerous fine, transverse striae. It contains nine slightly convex whorls to the spire, the upper longitudinally plaited. The sutures are pretty apparent, edged with small black and white slightly elongated spots. The brownish aperture is narrow and ovate. The outer lip is thin and delicately striated within. The columella is slightly arcuated and smooth, forming a small siphonal canal, emarginated at its base.

Distribution
This species occurs in the Indian Ocean off Mauritius and Réunion; in the Pacific Ocean off the Philippines

References

 Lussi M. (2001) Revision of the genus Aesopus Gould, 1860 in South Africa with the description of a new species (Gastropoda: Prosobranchia: Neogastropoda). Malacologia Mostra Mondiale 35: 23–28. [October 2001]
 Monsecour K. & Monsecour D. (2007) The Aesopus (Lavesopus) spiculus species complex in the tropical Indo-Pacific (Mollusca, Caenogastropoda, Columbellidae). Visaya 2(2): 57–61.
 Monsecour K. (2010). Checklist of Columbellidae

External links
 

Columbellidae
Gastropods described in 1834